Triumphans may refer to :

Cortinarius triumphans is a basidiomycete mushroom of the genus Cortinarius found in Europe
Ecclesia Triumphans is a term of Christian ecclesiology which comprises those Catholics who are in Heaven.
Juditha triumphans is an oratorio by Antonio Vivaldi.